The 1986 NCAA Division I-A football season ended with Penn State winning the national championship. Coached by Joe Paterno, they defeated Miami (Fl) 14–10 in the Fiesta Bowl. This Fiesta Bowl was the first in the game's history to decide the national championship, launching it into the top tier of bowls.

Miami came into the game No. 1 and Penn State No. 2. In a move that would come to symbolize the game for years to come, Miami arrived wearing combat fatigues while Penn State arrived wearing suits and ties.

Despite all the hype surrounding Miami, Penn State's defense harassed and harried Heisman trophy winner Vinny Testaverde throughout the Fiesta Bowl. The Hurricanes committed seven turnovers, including five interceptions thrown by Testaverde – the last of which, in the end zone with 18 seconds left, won the game for the Nittany Lions.

Conference and program changes
The Missouri Valley Conference ended the hybrid nature of the conference which featured Division I-AA programs Drake, Illinois State, Indiana State, Southern Illinois, and West Texas State. Two of the league's members, Tulsa and Wichita State, became independents and remained in Division I-A.

Rule changes
Kickoffs are moved from the 40-yard line to the 35-yard line, mirroring a change made in 1974 by the NFL, and receivers may not line up closer than 10 yards from the spot of the kickoff.
The definition of "Roughing the passer" is expanded to prohibit throwing passers to the ground after the ball is released.
The definition of a "catch" is clarified to require players maintain control of a ball when returning to the ground, and an incomplete pass will be called if there is doubt in the official's mind that the catch was made.
The penalty for batting loose balls forward in the field of play or anywhere in the end zone now includes loss of down.
Clipping that occurs behind the scrimmage line will be enforced from the previous spot.
The loss of down penalty for ineligible man downfield penalties is removed.

Conference standings

Regular season

September
Defending champion Oklahoma was No. 1 in the preseason AP Poll, followed by No. 2 Michigan, No. 3 Miami, No. 4 UCLA, and No. 5 Alabama. Alabama beat No. 9 Ohio State 16-10 in the Kickoff Classic on August 27 and Miami won 34-14 at South Carolina on August 30, but no new poll was taken the following week.

September 6: No. 1 Oklahoma hosted No. 4 UCLA and overwhelmed the Bruins 38-3. No. 2 Michigan had not begun its season. No. 3 Miami won 23-15 at Florida, No. 5 Alabama defeated Vanderbilt 42-10, and No. 6 Penn State beat Temple 45-15. The next AP Poll featured No. 1 Oklahoma, No. 2 Miami, No. 3 Michigan, No. 4 Alabama, and No. 5 Penn State.

September 13: No. 1 Oklahoma and No. 5 Penn State were idle. No. 2 Miami dominated Texas Tech 61-11, No. 3 Michigan won 24-23 at Notre Dame in Lou Holtz’s first game as the Fighting Irish head coach, and No. 4 Alabama beat Southern Mississippi 31-17. The top five remained the same in the next poll.

September 20: No. 1 Oklahoma had its second consecutive blowout win, 63-0 over Minnesota. No. 2 Miami was idle. No. 3 Michigan beat Oregon State 31-12, but still slipped a few spots in the next poll. No. 4 Alabama won 21-7 at No. 13 Florida. No. 5 Penn State also fell to a lower ranking despite a win (26-14 at Boston College). No. 6 Nebraska, which defeated Illinois 59-14, moved into the top five: No. 1 Oklahoma, No. 2 Miami, No. 3 Alabama, No. 4 Nebraska, and No. 5 Michigan.

September 27: In a highly anticipated matchup, No. 1 Oklahoma faced off against No. 2 Miami, the only team which had defeated them in 1985. The Sooners were no luckier this year than last, as Vinny Testaverde led the Hurricanes to a 28-16 victory. This was a major blow for the Sooners, who would finish the 1986 season ranked first in all four major defensive statistical categories – a feat not to be duplicated until 2012, by Alabama – but remained stuck behind Miami in the polls for the rest of the year. No. 3 Alabama was idle. No. 4 Nebraska beat Oregon 48-14, No. 5 Michigan squeaked past No. 20 Florida State 20-18, and No. 6 Penn State won 42-17 over East Carolina. The top five in the next poll was No. 1 Miami, No. 2 Alabama, No. 3 Nebraska, No. 4 Michigan, and No. 5 Penn State.

October
October 4: No. 1 Miami shut out Northern Illinois 34-0, No. 2 Alabama beat Notre Dame 28-10, No. 3 Nebraska won 27-24 in a back-and-forth game at South Carolina, No. 4 Michigan defeated Wisconsin 34-17, and No. 5 Penn State beat Rutgers 31-6. The top five remained the same in the next poll.

October 11: No. 1 Miami won 58-14 at West Virginia, No. 2 Alabama blanked Memphis 37-0, No. 3 Nebraska beat Oklahoma State 30-10, and No. 4 Michigan defeated Michigan State 27-6. No. 5 Penn State needed a late comeback to beat Cincinnati 23-17, and No. 6 Oklahoma, which bounced back with a 47-12 victory over Texas, moved ahead of the Nittany Lions in the next poll: No. 1 Miami, No. 2 Alabama, No. 3 Nebraska, No. 4 Michigan, and No. 5 Oklahoma.

October 18: No. 1 Miami won 45-13 at Cincinnati, No. 2 Alabama defeated Tennessee 56-28, and No. 3 Nebraska beat Missouri 48-17. A No. 1 vs No. 2 matchup the previous season between Iowa and Michigan had decided the race for the 1986 Rose Bowl; in the 1986 rematch, the No. 4-ranked Wolverines got revenge on the No. 8-ranked Hawkeyes with a 20–17 win. No. 5 Oklahoma shut out Oklahoma State 19-0, and the top five remained the same in the next poll.

October 25: No. 1 Miami was idle, while No. 6 Penn State defeated No. 2 Alabama 23-3 in Tuscaloosa. The Hurricanes and the Nittany Lions both played relatively weak schedules with the exceptions of powerhouses Oklahoma and Alabama, and their upset victories bolstered their national championship aspirations. No. 3 Nebraska fell 20-10 at Colorado. No. 4 Michigan won 38-14 at Indiana. No. 5 Oklahoma achieved their second consecutive shutout, 38-0 at Iowa State, and No. 7 Auburn beat No. 13 Mississippi State 35-6. The top five in the next poll were No. 1 Miami, No. 2 Penn State, No. 3 Michigan, No. 4 Oklahoma, and No. 5 Auburn.

November
November 1: The top four teams all won easily. No. 1 Miami defeated No. 20 Florida State 41-23, No. 2 Penn State shut out West Virginia 19-0, No. 3 Michigan overwhelmed Illinois 69-13, and No. 4 Oklahoma crushed Kansas 64-3. However, No. 5 Auburn blew a 17-0 lead in an 18-17 loss at Florida. No. 6 Washington matched up against No. 7 Arizona State, and the Sun Devils won 34-21 to take over first place in the Pac-10. They had already beaten both USC and UCLA in Los Angeles, the first Pacific-10 conference team to do so in the same year. The top five in the next poll were No. 1 Miami, No. 2 Penn State, No. 3 Michigan, No. 4 Oklahoma, and No. 5 Arizona State.

November 8: No. 1 Miami won 37-10 at Pittsburgh. No. 2 Penn State barely got past Maryland 17-15, with the Terrapins falling short on a last-minute two-point conversion attempt. The AP voters were more impressed by No. 3 Michigan’s 31-7 victory at Purdue, and the Wolverines moved up in the next poll. No. 4 Oklahoma and No. 5 Arizona State won in lopsided shutouts, 77-0 over Missouri and 49-0 over California. (This was the latest episode in a difficult year for Cal coach Joe Kapp, who had unzipped his pants in front of the Seattle media following an embarrassing 50–18 loss against Washington in October and would be fired after the season.) The Sun Devils’ victory allowed them to clinch the Pac-10 title and a Rose Bowl berth. The next poll featured No. 1 Miami, No. 2 Michigan, No. 3 Penn State, No. 4 Oklahoma, and No. 5 Arizona State.

November 15: No. 1 Miami beat Tulsa 23-10. Minnesota was a 25–point underdog in a road game against No. 2 Michigan; the Gophers had not defeated the Wolverines since 1977. Nevertheless, Michigan trailed in the fourth quarter and scored a touchdown to tie the game at 17 with only two minutes to go. On the ensuing Minnesota possession, quarterback Rickey Foggie scrambled to put Chip Lohmiller in field goal position; Lohmiller connected for a 20–17 Gophers victory. No. 3 Penn State had another close one, stopping Notre Dame 24-19 after the Irish had driven to the Lions’ 6-yard line with a minute left. No. 4 Oklahoma blanked Colorado 28-0; the Sooners had outscored their last five opponents 226-3. No. 5 Arizona State defeated Wichita State 52-6, and No. 6 Nebraska overwhelmed Kansas 70-0. The next poll featured No. 1 Miami, No. 2 Penn State, No. 3 Oklahoma, No. 4 Arizona State, and No. 5 Nebraska.

November 22: No. 1 Miami was idle. No. 2 Penn State finished an undefeated regular season with a 34-14 victory over Pittsburgh. No. 3 Oklahoma and No. 5 Nebraska met in Lincoln to decide the Big 8 title and an Orange Bowl berth. The Sooners entered the fourth quarter trailing by ten points, but came back to win 20-17 on a field goal with time running out. No. 4 Arizona State lost 34-17 at Arizona. No. 6 Michigan and No. 7 Ohio State, both undefeated in Big Ten play, met to determine who would be the Sun Devils’ Rose Bowl opponent. Quarterback Jim Harbaugh guaranteed a Michigan victory: "We don't care where we play the game. I hate to say it, but we could play it in the parking lot. We could play the game at 12 noon or midnight. We're going to be jacked up." This game also was decided by a late field goal, but this time it was an Ohio State miss which gave Michigan a 26-24 victory. No. 8 LSU, who had already clinched the SEC title and a Sugar Bowl berth, defeated Notre Dame 21-19. The next poll featured No. 1 Miami, No. 2 Penn State, No. 3 Oklahoma, No. 4 Michigan, and No. 5 LSU.

November 27-29: No. 2 Penn State, No. 3 Oklahoma, and No. 4 Michigan had finished their seasons. No. 1 Miami finished undefeated with a 36-10 win over East Carolina, and No. 5 LSU completed their schedule by defeating Tulane 37-17. The last remaining major conference race was also decided this week, as No. 10 Texas A&M clinched the SWC title and a Cotton Bowl berth with a 16-3 victory at Texas. The top five remained the same in the final poll of the regular season.

No. 1 and No. 2 Progress

Notable rivalry games
LSU 37, Tulane 17
Michigan 24, Notre Dame 23
Notre Dame 38, USC 37
Oklahoma 20, Nebraska 17
UCLA 45, USC 25
Arkansas 21, Texas 14
(4) Arizona State 17, (14) Arizona 34

Arkansas' victory over Texas was the Razorbacks' first win in Austin since 1966.

Bowl games

With Arizona State having clinched the Rose Bowl berth on November 8, and the Fiesta Bowl and Citrus Bowl scrambling to bid for the No. 1 Miami (Florida) vs. No. 2 Penn State Game, the Cotton Bowl struck an agreement to take the loser of the Michigan-Ohio State game. All the bowl games attempted to line up participants before the official bids were extended on November 22. The Sugar Bowl agreed to take the loser of the Oklahoma-Nebraska game to match the SEC winner, and the Orange Bowl agreed to take the second place SWC team to match the Big 8 winner. The Citrus Bowl, which moved to January 1, got a second place SEC team in Auburn, and, what they hoped would be a good matchup, in 7–2 USC. The Trojans would lose to UCLA and Notre Dame after they were invited.

Rose Bowl: No. 7 Arizona State 22, No. 4 Michigan 15
Sugar Bowl: No. 6 Nebraska 30, No. 5 LSU 15
Cotton Bowl: No. 11 Ohio State 28, No. 8 Texas A&M 12
Orange Bowl: No. 3 Oklahoma 42, No. 9 Arkansas 8
Fiesta Bowl: No. 2 Penn State 14, No. 1 Miami (FL) 10

Other bowls:
Florida Citrus Bowl: No. 10 Auburn 16, USC 7
Hall of Fame Bowl: Boston College 27, No. 17 Georgia 24
Gator Bowl: Clemson 27, No. 20 Stanford 21
Sun Bowl: No. 13 Alabama 28, No. 12 Washington 6
Holiday Bowl: No. 19 Iowa 39, San Diego State 38
Freedom Bowl: No. 15 UCLA 31, BYU 10
Peach Bowl: Virginia Tech 25, No. 18 NC State 24
All-American Bowl: Florida State 27, Indiana 13
Liberty Bowl: Tennessee 21, Minnesota 14 
Aloha Bowl: No. 16 Arizona 30, North Carolina 21
Independence Bowl: Mississippi 20, Texas Tech 17
California Bowl: San Jose State 37, Miami (Ohio) 7
Bluebonnet Bowl: No. 14 Baylor 21, Colorado 9

Polls

Final AP Poll
 Penn State
 Miami (FL)
 Oklahoma
 Arizona State
 Nebraska
 Auburn
 Ohio State 
 Michigan
 Alabama 
 LSU
 Arizona
 Baylor 
 Texas A&M
 UCLA
 Arkansas
 Iowa
 Clemson
 Washington
 Boston College
 Virginia Tech

Final Coaches Poll
 Penn State
 Miami (FL)
 Oklahoma
 Nebraska
 Arizona St.
 Ohio St.
 Michigan
 Auburn
 Alabama
 Arizona
 LSU
 Texas A&M
 Baylor
 UCLA
 Iowa
 Arkansas
 Washington
 Boston College
 Clemson
 Florida St.

Awards

Heisman Trophy voting
The Heisman Trophy is given to the year's most outstanding player

Other major awards
Maxwell (Player):Vinny Testaverde, Miami (Fl)
Camp (Back): Vinny Testaverde, Miami (Fl)
O'Brein Award (QB): Vinny Testaverde, Miami (Fl)
Rockne (Lineman): N/A
Lombardi (Defensive Front Seven): Cornelius Bennett, Alabama
Butkus (Linebacker): Brian Bosworth, Oklahoma
Outland (Interior): Jason Buck, BYU
Coach of the Year: Joe Paterno, Penn State

References